Philadelphia consistently ranks above the national average in terms of crime, especially violent offenses. It has the highest violent crime rate of the ten American cities with a population greater than 1 million residents as well as the highest poverty rate among these cities. It has been included in real estate analytics company NeighborhoodScout's "Top 100 Most Dangerous Cities in America" list every year since it has been compiled. Much of the crime is concentrated in the North, West, and Southwest sections of the city.

The legal entities responsible for maintaining law and order are: 
The Philadelphia Police Department (PPD) is the police department.
The Court of Common Pleas of Philadelphia County (1st Judicial Circuit) is the state trial court.
The Philadelphia District Attorney is the district attorney. 
The Defender Association of Philadelphia is the government-funded independent public defender office.

Notable cases and incidents 
 Philadelphia Election Riot (1742)
 Lombard Street Riot (1842) – Three-day race riot.
 Philadelphia Nativist Riots (1844)
 The Schuylkill Rangers – (mid-1800s) criminal gang – see Jimmy Haggerty
 Kidnapping of Charley Ross (1874).
 Race riots in Philadelphia during the 1919 Red Summer (1919) - Incidents in May and July. 5 dead.
 Willie Sutton "The Robin Hood of Brooklyn" (1930–1950s) – Robbed most Philadelphia Banks, some twice, captured and tunneled out of Eastern State Penitentiary was recaptured and sent to Holmesburg Prison which he subsequently escaped from by ladder.
 Philadelphia Poison Ring (1938) – At least 70 people poisoned with arsenic, several by their wives.
 Philadelphia 1964 race riot (1964)
 Marie Noe (1949–1968) – Murdered eight of her children.
 Jospeph Augustus Zarelli (1957) – Four-year-old boy found dead in a cardboard box.
 Dolores Della Penna – 1972 abduction and dismemberment of Tacony teenager remains unsolved.
 Carl Gugasian – "The Friday Night Bank Robber" (1972-2002) – Perhaps the most successful in American history – robbed banks up and down the east coast.
 Joseph Kallinger – Schizophrenic Serial Murderer. (1974–75) 
 Ira Einhorn, "The Unicorn Killer" (1977) – Popular counterculture figure killed his girlfriend and hid her body in his closet.
 Ed Savitz (1975–1992) – Sexual predator thought to have abused hundreds of teenage boys.
 Mumia Abu-Jamal (1981) – Convicted for the murder of PPD officer Daniel Faulkner in 1981.
 Joseph Kindler – Serial burglar convicted of 1982 murder, sentenced to death, escaped prison twice, extradited from Canada.
 MOVE (1978,1985) – Activist group which was harassed by the PPD, resulting in the police's purposeful destruction of 65 homes along with 11 deaths in Cobb's Creek neighborhood. 
 Abscam- Several Philadelphia/Delaware valley politicians taken down in FBI investigation, videotaped accepting bribes from an Arabian company in exchange for political favors.
 Frankford Slasher (1985–1990) – Thought to have killed several women. Never caught, though a prime suspect referred to only as 'The Minister' was known to police.
 Gary M. Heidnik (1986–1987) – Kidnapped, imprisoned, raped, and tortured six women, two of whom he murdered.
 Harrison Graham (1986–1987) – Killed seven women.
 Raymond Carter (1988) – Convicted of killing Robert "Puppet" Harris; verdict overturned in 1996 due to likelihood of false testimony.
 39th District corruption scandal (1990s) – Police corruption which led to the overturning of 160–300 cases and release of 100 prisoners.
 Eddie Polec murder case (1994)
 Troy Graves "Center City Rapist" (1997–1999) – Committed five rapes and one murder
 Lex Street Massacre (Dec. 28th, 2000) – 7 people were murdered in a crack house.
 Murder of Jason Sweeney (2003) – 16 year old murdered by his friends for his paycheck.
 City Hall corruption scandal (2003–05) – mayor's office bugged by FBI, several convictions resulting.
 Tainted Justice- A group of officers from the police department's narcotics unit illegally raided homes and stores in inner city neighborhoods during drug investigations and engaged in illegal activity such as groping women, taking money from cash registers and knocking out store security cameras.
 Kermit Gosnell (?–2010) – Abortion doctor convicted of killing newborns.
 Earl Bradley (?–2010) – Pediatrician charged with hundreds of sex crimes against children.
 Philadelphia basement kidnapping, October 2011, an ongoing investigation into alleged kidnapping of four mentally disabled adults, who were held in a Northeast Philadelphia basement.

Homicides

Organized crime 
 Philadelphia crime family – An Italian American group based in South Philadelphia as well as cities in New Jersey such as Atlantic City and Newark; largest organized crime unit in the area.
 K&A Gang – Based in Kensington, Philadelphia. One of the largest Irish American gangs in the country.
 Philadelphia Greek Mob
 Black Mafia and Junior Black Mafia – An African-American group based in West Philadelphia.
 Warlocks Motorcycle Club – A motorcycle club involved in drug dealing

Documentaries 
 Law and Disorder in Philadelphia, 2008
 The Fear of 13, 2015

See also 
 Crime in Pennsylvania
 Crime in the United States
 H. H. Holmes – Early American serial killer, brought to justice by a Philadelphia detective.
 On the Run: Fugitive Life in an American City – non-fiction book by sociologist Alice Goffman
 Vidocq Society – Local crime-solving club

References

Further reading

External links 
 Down With Crime a project of The Philadelphia Inquirer.

 
Philadelphia
Philadelphia